National Highway 108A, commonly referred to as NH 108A is a national highway in  India. It is a spur road of National Highway 8. NH-108A traverses the state of Tripura in India.

Route 
Jolaibari - Belonia - Indo/Bangladesh border  .

Junctions 

  Terminal near Jolaibari.

See also 

 List of National Highways in India
 List of National Highways in India by state

References

External links 

 NH 108A on OpenStreetMap

National highways in India
National Highways in Tripura